Katrina Berger-Grove (born April 9, 1974) is a road cyclist from United States. She represented her nation at the 2001 UCI Road World Championships.

References

External links
 

1974 births
American female cyclists
Living people
Place of birth missing (living people)
21st-century American women